Leontine's Husbands (German: Leontines Ehemänner) is a 1928 German silent comedy film directed by Robert Wiene and starring Claire Rommer, Georg Alexander and Carl Walther Meyer. It was based on a play by Alfred Capus. A French dancer works her way through a series of husbands, spending their money. The film received poor reviews from critics, who expected better from the director.

Cast
 Claire Rommer - Leontine 
 Georg Alexander   
 Carl Walther Meyer   
 Adele Sandrock   
 Luigi Serventi   
 Oskar Sima   
 Lotte Stein   
 Truus Van Aalten   
 Alexa von Porembsky

References

Bibliography
 Jung, Uli & Schatzberg, Walter. Beyond Caligari: The Films of Robert Wiene. Berghahn Books, 1999.

External links

Films of the Weimar Republic
1928 films
German silent feature films
German comedy films
Films directed by Robert Wiene
German films based on plays
1928 comedy films
Terra Film films
German black-and-white films
Silent comedy films
1920s German films
1920s German-language films